Deraeocoris nigritulus is a species of plant bugs in the family Miridae. It is found in North America.

References

 Thomas J. Henry, Richard C. Froeschner. (1988). Catalog of the Heteroptera, True Bugs of Canada and the Continental United States. Brill Academic Publishers.

Further reading

 

Insects described in 1921
Deraeocorini